Rasheeduddin Khan (1924-1996) was an Indian author and parliamentarian. was a Pathan, hailing from Kaimganj in Farrukhabad district, Uttar Pradesh, and was a nephew of Dr. Zakir Hussain (President of India – 1967 to 1969).

Early life and background 
He was born in 1924.

Career 
Rasheeduddin was a communist politician  favoured by Indira Gandhi and was made a nominated member of the Rajya Sabha at a relatively young age, in the early 1970s. He was also a professor of political science, and in the early 1970s, he became one of the founding professors of Jawaharlal Nehru University. He wrote a number of papers and studies on socio-economic problems and culture.

Sources
Brief Biodata

References 

Nominated members of the Rajya Sabha
1924 births
1996 deaths
Indian social sciences writers